S45 may refer to:

Aviation 
 Blériot-SPAD S.45, a French biplane airliner
 SABCA S-45bis, a Belgian bomber
 Short S.45, a British biplane trainer
 Short S.45 Seaford, a British flying boat
 Sikorsky S-45, a proposed American flying boat
 Siletz Bay State Airport, in Lincoln County, Oregon, United States

Rail and transit 
 S45 (Berlin), a line of the Berlin S-Bahn
 S45 (Long Island bus)
 S45 (Vienna), a line of the Vienna S-Bahn

Other uses 
 Canon PowerShot S45, a digital camera
 Explorer S-45 (satellite), a failed American spacecraft
 S45: In case of accident or if you feel unwell seek medical advice immediately (show the label where possible), a safety phrase
 , a submarine of the Indian Navy
 Siemens S45, a mobile phone
 Sulfur-45, an isotope of sulfur
 , a submarine of the United States Navy
 S45, a postcode district in Chesterfield, England
 Saviem S45, a Savien bus model

See also
 45S (disambiguation)